Linus Wiklund (born 3 February 1983), also known as Lotus IV, is a Swedish songwriter and music producer. He has written and produced songs for artists such as Avicii, Zedd, Alessia Cara, Future, Ty Dolla Sign, David Guetta, Sasha Sloan, Sam Smith and Rita Ora.
 
"Stay" by Zedd & Alessia Cara was co-written and produced by Linus and reached No. 7 on Billboard Hot 100 and No. 1 on Mainstream Top 40. "Stay" was the fourth most performed song on US Radio in 2017.

Discography

References

1983 births
Living people
Swedish record producers
Swedish songwriters